Lilanje is a south Slavic  custom practiced mostly by Roman Catholic but also by Orthodox and Muslim, with commonly the young burning a dry birch or cherry cortex placed on the wooden stick (named lila, olalija, oratnik or oratnica) the night before Saint John's Eve, Feast of Saints Peter and Paul, Feast of the Ascension and Feast of Saint Elijah, while it is most connected to Petrovdan, the feast day (Slava) of St. Peter (thus known as petrovdansko lilanje). The custom is of pagan origin, based in the belief that during nights fire scares demons and witches and protects people, animals and fields. Some believe the name olalija comes from the Roman word for the Roman custom Parilia.

See also
Smudge stick

References 

Serb traditions
Traditions involving fire
Fire in religion